Khulna City Corporation ( - in short: KCC), Khulna Municipality, established in 1884, is one of the major divisional city corporations of Bangladesh. Before its establishment as city corporation, it was a municipal corporation in 1984. Current mayor of KCC is Talukder Abdul Khaleque who was advocated by Bangladesh Awami League. Basically, Khulna City Corporation is a formation under the local government administration of Bangladesh to regulate the city area of Khulna, which is under the Ministry of Local Government & Rural Development (LGRD). Generally under local government, an election is held to elect a mayor of Khluna City Corporation. This election is held in every 5 years. Khulna City Corporation is self-governing organizations, which runs on its own. To take care of legal issues of this corporation, Metropolitan Magistrate Court (CMM court) is there.

History
For the first time Khulna was declared as a Municipality by The Calcutta Gazettee on 8 September 1884. Gagan Chandra Dutta was the first chairman of the Khulna Municipality Board. That time Khulna municipality was consisted with Tootpara, Sheikhpara, Charabati, Helatala and Koyla ghat area.

After Independence of Bangladesh  the Municipality renamed as Khulna Pouroshava by Bangladesh Local Council and Municipal Committee (desolation and administration arrangement) order - 1972.

In 1984 Khulna Municipality updated to Khulna Municipal Corporation on the 100th anniversary of the township by the president Hussein Muhammad Ershad.

Wards
Khulna City Corporation consists with 31 wards.

Services 
The Khulna City Corporation is responsible for administering and providing basic infrastructure to the city.
 Garbage disposal and street cleanliness
 Solid waste management
 Building and maintenance of roads and streets.
 Street lighting
 Maintenance of parks and open spaces
 Cemeteries and Crematoriums
 Registering of births and deaths
 Conservation of heritage sites
 Disease control, including immunization
 Public municipal schools  etc.

Elections

Election Result 2018

Election Result 2013

List of chairman
 Gagan Chandra Dutta (1884)
 Roy Bahadur Mahendra Kumar Ghosh (1928-1948)

List of mayors

See also
 Khulna Development Authority
 Khulna Metropolitan Police

References

 
City Corporations of Bangladesh
Khulna